Calvin Kattar (born March 26, 1988) is an American professional mixed martial artist. He currently competes in the Featherweight division in the Ultimate Fighting Championship (UFC). A professional competitor since 2007, Kattar formerly competed for EliteXC. As of November 8, 2022, he is #7 in the UFC featherweight rankings.

Background
The son of James and Sandra Kattar, Calvin was born and raised in Methuen, Massachusetts. He has two brothers and a sister. After initiating in the sport in ninth grade, Kattar was a standout wrestler at Methuen High School, being ranked as high as eighth in the state (160 pounds) and placing fifth at the Division I MIAA state championships as a senior in 2006. After graduating, he was unsure whether he should wrestle in college or not, and ended up opting to pursue a career in mixed martial arts. He went on to earn an associate degree at Middlesex Community College. In an interview, Kattar expressed that he got a chance to train with Nick and Nate Diaz when he was 19 years old, and how that influenced his way of training, stating:

Mixed martial arts career
Kattar won eight consecutive bouts and was unbeaten in over seven years competing on the regional circuit primarily in his native New England prior to his UFC career.

Ultimate Fighting Championship
Kattar made his UFC debut replacing Choi Doo-ho against Andre Fili on July 29, 2017 at UFC 214. Kattar won the fight by unanimous decision.

Kattar faced undefeated prospect Shane Burgos on January 20, 2018 at UFC 220. Kattar won the fight via technical knock out in round three. The fight was awarded the Fight of the Night bonus.

Kattar faced Renato Moicano on April 7, 2018 at UFC 223. He lost the fight by unanimous decision.

Kattar faced promotional newcomer Chris Fishgold on October 27, 2018 at UFC Fight Night 138. He won the fight via technical knockout in the first round. By the bout, Kattar fulfilled his first four-fight contract with the UFC.

Kattar faced Ricardo Lamas at UFC 238 on June 8, 2019. He won the fight via knockout in the first round.

Kattar was scheduled to face Zabit Magomedsharipov on October 18, 2019 at UFC on ESPN 6. However, Magomedsharipov was removed from the card due to injury on September 13 and the pairing was rescheduled for the following month at UFC on ESPN+ 21. He lost the fight via unanimous decision. This fight earned him the Fight of the Night award.

Kattar was scheduled to face Jeremy Stephens on April 18, 2020 at UFC 249. However, on April 9, Dana White, the president of UFC announced that this event was postponed and the bout eventually took place on May 9, 2020. At the weigh-ins on May 8, Stephens missed weight, weighing in at 150.5 pounds, 4.5 pounds over the non-title featherweight limit. As a result, the bout proceeded as a catchweight bout and Stephens was fined 20% of his purse which went to Kattar. Kattar won the fight via technical knockout in round two.

The first bout of his new six-fight contract came against Dan Ige on July 16, 2020 at UFC on ESPN: Kattar vs. Ige. Kattar won the fight via unanimous decision.

Next, Kattar faced former UFC Featherweight Champion Max Holloway, while headlining UFC on ABC 1 on January 16, 2021. In a one-sided fight where Kattar suffered plenty of physical trauma due to Holloway's strikes, which set multiple UFC records, he was defeated by unanimous decision. Despite being a one-sided fight, both competitors earned the Fight of the Night award as Kattar was able to land powerful strikes of his own, despite all the damage he received.

Kattar faced Giga Chikadze on January 15, 2022 at UFC on ESPN 32. He won the fight via unanimous decision after knocking down and almost finishing Chikadze in the final seconds of the bout. This fight earned him the Fight of the Night award.

Kattar faced Josh Emmett on June 18, 2022 in the main event at UFC on ESPN 37. He lost the close bout via split decision. 14 of 19 MMA media outlets scored the bout in favor of Kattar. This fight earned him his third consecutive Fight of the Night award.

Kattar faced Arnold Allen on October 29, 2022 at UFC Fight Night 213, losing via technical knockout following a knee injury.

Titles and accomplishments

Mixed martial arts
 Ultimate Fighting Championship
Fight of the Night (Five times) .
MMAJunkie.com
2020 May Knockout of the Month vs. Jeremy Stephens

Mixed martial arts record 

|-
|Loss
|align=center|23–7
|Arnold Allen
|TKO (knee injury)
|UFC Fight Night: Kattar vs. Allen
|
|align=center|2
|align=center|0:08
|Las Vegas, Nevada, United States
|
|-
|Loss
|align=center|23–6
|Josh Emmett
|Decision (split)
|UFC on ESPN: Kattar vs. Emmett
|
|align=center|5
|align=center|5:00
|Austin, Texas, United States
|
|-
|Win
|align=center|23–5
|Giga Chikadze
|Decision (unanimous)
|UFC on ESPN: Kattar vs. Chikadze
|
|align=center|5
|align=center|5:00
|Las Vegas, Nevada, United States
|
|-
|Loss
|align=center|22–5
|Max Holloway
|Decision (unanimous)
|UFC on ABC: Holloway vs. Kattar
|
|align=center|5
|align=center|5:00
|Abu Dhabi, United Arab Emirates
|
|-
|-
|-
|Win
|align=center|22–4
|Dan Ige
|Decision (unanimous)
|UFC on ESPN: Kattar vs. Ige 
|
|align=center|5
|align=center|5:00
|Abu Dhabi, United Arab Emirates
|
|-
|Win
|align=center|21–4
|Jeremy Stephens
|KO (elbows)
|UFC 249
|
|align=center|2
|align=center|2:42
|Jacksonville, Florida, United States
|
|-
|Loss
|align=center|20–4
|Zabit Magomedsharipov
|Decision (unanimous)
|UFC Fight Night: Magomedsharipov vs. Kattar 
|
|align=center|3
|align=center|5:00
|Moscow, Russia
|
|-
|Win
|align=center|20–3
|Ricardo Lamas
|KO (punches) 
|UFC 238 
|
|align=center|1
|align=center|4:06
|Chicago, Illinois, United States
|
|-
|Win
|align=center|19–3
|Chris Fishgold
|TKO (punches)
|UFC Fight Night: Volkan vs. Smith 
|
|align=center|1
|align=center|4:11
|Moncton, New Brunswick, Canada
|  
|- 
|Loss
|align=center|18–3
|Renato Moicano
|Decision (unanimous)
|UFC 223
|
|align=center|3
|align=center|5:00
|Brooklyn, New York, United States
|
|-
|Win
|align=center|18–2
|Shane Burgos
|TKO (punches)
|UFC 220 
|
|align=center|3
|align=center|0:32
|Boston, Massachusetts, United States
|
|-
|Win
|align=center|17–2
|Andre Fili
|Decision (unanimous)
|UFC 214
|
|align=center|3
|align=center|5:00
|Anaheim, California, United States
|
|-
|Win
|align=center|16–2
|Chris Foster
|Decision (unanimous)
|CES 38: Soriano vs. Makashvili
|
|align=center|3
|align=center|5:00
|Mashantucket, Connecticut, United States
|
|-
|Win
|align=center|15–2
|Kenny Foster
|Decision (split)
|CES 34: Curtis vs. Burrell
|
|align=center|3
|align=center|5:00
|Mashantucket, Connecticut, United States
|
|-
|Win
|align=center|14–2
|Gabriel Baino
|Decision (unanimous)
|Combat Zone 44: Steel Cage Fighters
|
|align=center|3
|align=center|5:00
|Salem, New Hampshire, United States
|
|-
|Win
|align=center|13–2
|Saul Almeida
|Decision (unanimous)
|CES 13: Real Pain
|
|align=center|3
|align=center|5:00
|Providence, Rhode Island, United States
|
|-
|Win
|align=center|12–2
|Cody Stevens
|Decision (unanimous)
|Combat Zone 39: Smack Down at the Rock
|
|align=center|3
|align=center|5:00
|Salem, New Hampshire, United States
|
|-
|Win
|align=center|11–2
|Luiz Rodrigues
|Decision (unanimous)
|Combat Zone 36: Smashing on the Rock
|
|align=center|3
|align=center|5:00
|Salem, New Hampshire, United States
|
|-
|Win
|align=center|10–2
|Chris Connor
|TKO (punches)
|Combat Zone 33: Massacre in the Meadow
|
|align=center|1
|align=center|3:40
|Gilford, New Hampshire, United States
|
|-
|Win
|align=center| 9–2
|Jeff Anderson
|TKO (punches)
|Xtreme Championship Fight League 2
|
|align=center|3
|align=center|4:05
|Lowell, Massachusetts, United States
|
|-
|Loss
|align=center| 8–2
|Don Carlo-Clauss
|Decision (split)
|Xtreme Championship Fight League 1
|
|align=center| 3
|align=center| 5:00
|Marlborough, Massachusetts, United States
|
|-
|Win
|align=center| 8–1
|Andrew Montanez
|Decision (unanimous)
|American Steel Cagefighting 2
|
|align=center| 5
|align=center| 5:00
|Salem, New Hampshire, United States
|
|-
|Win
|align=center| 7–1
|Rodrigo Almeida 
|Submission (guillotine choke)
|World Championship Fighting 7
|
|align=center| 1
|align=center| 2:16
|Wilmington, Massachusetts, United States
|
|-
|Win
|align=center| 6–1
|Jonathan Bermudez
|TKO (punches)
|Combat Zone 27: The Rock 2
|
|align=center| 1
|align=center| 0:29
|Salem, New Hampshire, United States
|
|-
|Win
|align=center| 5–1
|Bobby Diaz
|Submission (triangle choke)
|World Championship Fighting 5
|
|align=center| 1
|align=center| 1:21
|Wilmington, Massachusetts, United States
|
|-
|Win
|align=center| 4–1
|Kevin Roddy
|KO (punches)
|Combat Zone 26: The Rock
|
|align=center| 1
|align=center| 0:47
|Salem, New Hampshire, United States
|
|-
|Loss
|align=center| 3–1
|James Jones
|Submission (rear-naked choke)
|EliteXC: Primetime
|
|align=center| 1
|align=center| 4:49
|Newark, New Jersey, United States
|
|-
|Win
|align=center| 3–0
|Bob Pupa
|TKO (submission to punches)
|Combat Zone 24: Renaissance
|
|align=center| 1
|align=center| 0:51
|Revere, Massachusetts, United States
|
|-
|Win
|align=center| 2–0
|Donald Peters
|TKO (punches)
|Combat Zone 23: Down and Out
|
|align=center| 1
|align=center| N/A
|Revere, Massachusetts, United States
|
|-
|Win
|align=center| 1–0
|Tony Armijo 
|TKO (punches)
|Combat Zone 22: Cage Masters 3
|
|align=center| 1
|align=center| 2:02
|Derry, New Hampshire, United States
|
|-

See also
 List of current UFC fighters
 List of male mixed martial artists

References

External links
 
 

American male mixed martial artists
1988 births
Living people
Featherweight mixed martial artists
Mixed martial artists from Massachusetts
American male sport wrestlers
Amateur wrestlers
American practitioners of Brazilian jiu-jitsu
People from Methuen, Massachusetts
Sportspeople from Essex County, Massachusetts
Ultimate Fighting Championship male fighters
Mixed martial artists utilizing boxing
Mixed martial artists utilizing wrestling
Mixed martial artists utilizing Brazilian jiu-jitsu
American people of Lebanese descent